The 10th Rhythmic Gymnastics Asian Championships was held in Kuala Lumpur, Malaysia from April 30 to May 2, 2018.

Medal winners

Medal table

See also
 2018 Rhythmic Gymnastics Asian Cup

References

Rhythmic Gymnastics Asian Championships
2018 in Malaysian sport
Gymnastics competitions in Malaysia
International gymnastics competitions hosted by Malaysia
2018 in gymnastics
Sport in Kuala Lumpur
May 2018 sports events in Malaysia
April 2018 sports events in Malaysia